Ink Master: Rivals is the fifth season of the tattooing competition series Ink Master that premiered on Spike on September 2 and concluded on December 16, 2014 with a total of 16 episodes. The show is hosted and judged by Jane's Addiction guitarist Dave Navarro, with accomplished tattoo artists Chris Núñez and Oliver Peck serving as series regular judges. The winner will receive a $100,000 prize, a feature in Inked Magazine and the title of Ink Master.

The premise of this season was featuring tattoo artist rivals as they compete against each other in an elimination-style competition.

This season saw the returns of season three contestants Jason Clay Dunn and Joshua Hibbard, who originally finished the competition in 6th and 5th place respectively.

The winner of the fifth season of Ink Master was Jason Clay Dunn, with James "Cleen Rock One" Steinke being the runner-up.

Judging and ranking

Judging Panel
The judging panel is responsible for passing judgement on each artist. They collaborate and use information from their own perception, the audience vote, human canvas vote, and the winner's worst vote to determine who should be sent home. Weight of decisions is set by the terms of the challenge skill.

Audience Voting
Audience voting is done through Facebook and Twitter, and was introduced in season 2. In season 5, the audience vote was used in the finale episode to guarantee one of the finalists a spot in the top two.

Human Canvas Jury
After the tattoos are completed, the canvases for the challenge gather and vote on the best and worst of that day's tattoos. While the primary judges have the final say, the weight of the canvas vote does affect the judging panels final decision.

Contestants
Names, experience, and cities stated are at time of filming.

Notes

Rivalries

Contestants' progress

  The contestant won Ink Master.
 The contestant was the runner-up.
 The contestant finished third in the competition.
 The contestant advanced to the finale.
 The contestant was exempt from the first elimination.
 The contestant won Best Tattoo of the Day.
 The contestant won their Head-to-Head challenge.
 The contestant was among the top.
 The contestant received positive critiques.
 The contestant received negative critiques.
 The contestant was in the bottom.
 The contestant was in the bottom and voted Worst Tattoo of the Day by the Human Canvas Jury.
 The contestant was eliminated from the competition.
 The contestant was voted Worst Tattoo of the Day and was eliminated from the competition.
 The contestant was disqualified from the competition.
 The contestant returned as a guest for that episode.

Episodes

References

 http://www.spike.com/shows/ink-master

External links
Official website
 

2014 American television seasons
Season 5